The 2015 Orlando City SC season was the club's fifth season of existence in Orlando and first in Major League Soccer, the top-flight league in the United States soccer league system.

Background 
On November 19, 2013, it was announced that Orlando City would be the next expansion franchise in Major League Soccer, the league's 21st team. The dissolution of C.D. Chivas USA following the 2014 MLS season resulted in Orlando City instead being the league's 20th franchise.

Following the completion of City's final season in USL Pro, the team released all but nine players from its roster. The remaining players, who would form the base of the 2015 roster, included Kaká, who was placed on loan with São Paulo FC in his native Brazil following his signing in June 2014.

On September 24, 2014, Orlando City manager Adrian Heath and New York City FC manager Jason Kreis took part in a draw to determine who would get top priorities in various selection mechanisms, including the 2014 MLS Expansion Draft and the 2015 MLS SuperDraft. Orlando City won the draw, and Adrian Heath selected the top pick in the Expansion Draft first. He would also choose the top pick in the SuperDraft, top selection priority for USL Pro and NASL players (beyond Orlando City's own USL Pro players, which the team had right of first refusal to), and second-to-last (then #20, now #19) in lottery ranking. Orlando City will be #2 in United States men's national soccer team player allocation ranking, #21 (now #20) in player discovery ranking, #21 (now #20) in re-entry draft ranking, and #2 in designated player ranking.

On October 17, 2014, the team broke ground on their new soccer-specific stadium. Due to delays in sales tax subsidies from the Florida Legislature, the team decided to assume stadium financing themselves, and committed to pay back the City of Orlando for the land purchased and any other costs already incurred. Orlando City played the 2015 season, and will play the entire 2016 season, in the remodeled Orlando Citrus Bowl Stadium.

For normal regular-season matches in 2015, Orlando City will open the sidelines and ends of the lower bowl only, except for the corners, along with the luxury suites. For the season opener on March 8 against New York City FC, however, the entire stadium was made available for sale. The team announced that the stadium's entire allotment of permanent seating was sold out on March 2. The team made 2,000 standing room only tickets available on March 4, and those sold out within 24 hours.

On November 14, 2014, Orlando City was drawn for the seventh pick in the dispersal draft for Chivas USA players, but chose to pass on their pick. Manager Adrian Heath signed a contract extension on November 21, 2014 committing him to the club through to the end of the 2017 MLS season.

Orlando City originally planned to train in late January in Brazil, but eventually cancelled those plans in favor of training in Orlando. They will instead train at Sylvan Lake Park in Sanford.

Orlando City opened the 2015 MLS season at the Citrus Bowl against the other expansion team for that season, New York City FC. The match ended in a 1–1 draw after Kaká scored an equalizer in the first minute of second half stoppage time. The attendance of 62,510 was the largest crowd to see a soccer match at the Citrus Bowl, the second-largest attendance ever for an MLS team's inaugural home match, and the ninth-largest crowd in MLS history for a standalone match.

Roster 
 Last updated on August 6, 2015

Competitions

Friendlies

Major League Soccer 

All times in regular season on Eastern Daylight Time (UTC-04:00)

Results summary

Results

Standings 
Eastern Conference table

Overall table

U.S. Open Cup 

Orlando City entered the 2015 U.S. Open Cup with the rest of Major League Soccer in the fourth round.

Player statistics

Appearances

Starting appearances are listed first, followed by substitute appearances after the + symbol where applicable.

|-
! colspan=10 style=background:#dcdcdc; text-align:center|Goalkeepers

|-
! colspan=10 style=background:#dcdcdc; text-align:center|Defenders

|-
! colspan=10 style=background:#dcdcdc; text-align:center|Midfielders

|-
! colspan=10 style=background:#dcdcdc; text-align:center|Forwards

|-
|colspan="10"|Players away from the club on loan:

|-
|colspan="10"|Players who appeared for the club but left during the season:

|}

Goalscorers

Shutouts

Disciplinary record

Player movement
Per Major League Soccer and club policies, terms of the deals do not get disclosed.

MLS SuperDraft picks 
Draft picks are not automatically signed to the team roster. The 2015 draft was held on January 15, 2015. Orlando had five selections.

Transfers in

Loans in

Transfers out

Loans out

Media 
Any matches that are not featured in the MLS national television package on either ESPN2, Fox Sports 1 or UniMás will air locally on WOFL FOX 35 or WRBW My65. The commentary team will be Jeff Radcliffe on play-by-play and Kevin Hartman on color commentary, with Holly Bristow as sideline reporter. In addition, most matches not on the MLS national television package will be simulcast on Fox Sports Florida or Sun Sports to fans outside the Orlando market. Some matches will be placed on tape delay to accommodate Tampa Bay Rays and Florida Marlins baseball games.

On the radio, matches will air on WTKS-FM "Real Radio 104.1" in English, with Tom Traxler and Adam Schick providing the call. When City is on a nationally televised match, Jeff Radcliffe will call the match on WTKS with Tom Traxler. Matches will also air on WONQ "La Grande 1030" in Spanish. The Spanish play-by-play announcer is Sergio Ruiz Torres, with color commentary by Israel Heredia. The Spanish radio feed will be used as the SAP Spanish feed on Fox Sports Florida and Sun Sports.

Orlando City does not black out matches not on the MLS national television package on MLS Live, enabling local fans to watch matches live via live stream.

See also 
 2015 in American soccer
 2015 Major League Soccer season

References 

2015 Major League Soccer season
2015
American soccer clubs 2015 season
2015 in sports in Florida